Felix Saarikoski  (21 June 1857 in Kuopio – 4 July 1920) was a Finnish politician. He was a member of the Senate of Finland.

1857 births
1920 deaths
People from Kuopio
People from Kuopio Province (Grand Duchy of Finland)
Finnish Party politicians
Finnish senators
Members of the Diet of Finland